Juárez is one of the 38 municipalities of Coahuila, in Northeastern Mexico with Don Margarito Garcia as Municipal President (January 2010 – July 2010). The municipal seat lies at Juárez. As of 2005, the municipality had a total population of 1,393.

References

Municipalities of Coahuila